Maubeugia is an extinct genus of traversodontid cynodonts from the Late Triassic of France. Isolated postcanine teeth are known from Saint-Nicolas-de-Port in northeastern France. The type species M. lotharingica was named in 1997. Many other cynodont teeth were found alongside those of Maubeugia, including those of dromatheriids, probainognathids, and other traversodontids. The size of its teeth indicates that Maubeugia was a dwarf traversodontid. The deposit in which the teeth were found indicates that it lived along the shoreline of an ocean.

References

Traversodontids
Prehistoric cynodont genera
Triassic France
Fossils of France
Late Triassic synapsids of Europe
Fossil taxa described in 1997
Taxa named by Pascal Godefroit